Ricardo Rincón Espinoza (born April 13, 1970) is a Mexican former professional baseball relief pitcher.

Career
Rincón was a left-handed specialist who spent nearly his entire career as a middle reliever and setup pitcher. In his 11-year career, Rincón never started a game and only accumulated 21 saves; he is generally credited with 109 holds. On November 18, 1998 he was traded to the Cleveland Indians for outfielder Brian Giles. He later pitched for the Oakland Athletics and St. Louis Cardinals.

Rincón played for his native Mexico in the 2006 World Baseball Classic, appearing in four games. Shortly after the Classic and five games into his Cardinal career, Rincón experienced shoulder pain and later underwent surgery to repair a torn labrum and rotator cuff. He also had Tommy John surgery on his left elbow, forcing him to miss the remainder of the  season. On January 25, Rincón signed with the New York Mets. He was loaned to the Mexico City Red Devils for the 2008 season, and was returned on August 28 and assigned to Triple-A New Orleans. Rincón played for Mexico in the 2009 World Baseball Classic and then for several teams in Mexico before retiring in 2012.

Rincón was part of a combined no-hitter on July 12, 1997. After Francisco Córdova threw nine innings of no-hit ball, Rincón relieved him and pitched a scoreless 10th. Teammate Mark Smith then hit a three-run walk-off home run in the bottom of the 10th to give Rincón the win. To date, it is the last no-hitter in Pirates history.

He throws a four-seam fastball, slider, changeup, and two-seam fastball. He is currently married to his wife Jaqueline, they have two children, a daughter, Damaris, and a son, Ricardo, Jr. 

He is a subject of the 2003 book Moneyball: The Art of Winning an Unfair Game and the 2011 film based on the book.

Notes

External links

1970 births
Living people
Akron Aeros players
Baseball players from Veracruz
Buffalo Bisons (minor league) players
Carolina Mudcats players
Cleveland Indians players
Diablos Rojos del México players
Fresno Grizzlies players
Major League Baseball pitchers
Major League Baseball players from Mexico
Mexican expatriate baseball players in the United States
Mexican League baseball pitchers
Nashville Sounds players
New Orleans Zephyrs players
New York Mets players
Oakland Athletics players
Petroleros de Minatitlán players
Pittsburgh Pirates players
Rieleros de Aguascalientes players
St. Louis Cardinals players
Sultanes de Monterrey players
2006 World Baseball Classic players
2009 World Baseball Classic players